A by-election was held for the New South Wales Legislative Assembly electorate of East Sydney on 15 July 1877 because John Davies was appointed Postmaster-General in the fourth Robertson ministry. Such ministerial by-elections were usually uncontested however on this occasion a poll was required in Central Cumberland (John Lackey and William Long), East Sydney, Orange (Edward Combes) and West Sydney (John Robertson). Each minister was comfortably re-elected. Only Camden (Thomas Garrett) and Goldfields South (Ezekiel Baker) were uncontested.

Dates

Result

John Davies was appointed Postmaster-General in the fourth Robertson ministry.

See also
Electoral results for the district of East Sydney
List of New South Wales state by-elections

Notes

References

1877 elections in Australia
New South Wales state by-elections
1870s in New South Wales